The XXVI 2023 Pan Am Badminton Championships is a continental championships tournament of badminton in Pan America. This tournament was held as two events in different countries. From 16 to 19 February, the team event was held in Guadalajara, Mexico. From 27 to 30 April, the individual event was held in Kingston, Jamaica.

Tournament
The team event of 2023 Pan Am Badminton Championships officially Pan American Cup 2023, was a team continental championships tournament of badminton, to crown the best mixed team in Pan America, who would qualify to 2023 Sudirman Cup. This event was organized by the Badminton Pan Am and Federacion Mexicana de Badminton. 10 teams entered the tournament.

The individual event of Pan Am Badminton Championships was an individual continental championships tournament of badminton, to crowns the best male and female players and pairs in Pan America. The ranking points of this tournament were graded as BWF World Tour Super 100 event. This event was organized by the Badminton Pan Am and Jamaica Badminton Association.

Venue
The team event was held at Centro de Alto CODE Guadalajara in Guadalajara, Mexico.
The individual event venue was held at G.C. Foster College of Physical Education and Sport in Kingston, Jamaica.

Point distribution
Below is the tables with the point distribution for each phase of the individual event tournament based on the BWF points system for the Pan Am Badminton Championships.

Medalists

Team event

Group A

Canada vs Ecuador

El Salvador vs Ecuador

Canada vs El Salvador

Group B

United States vs Mexico

Argentina vs Mexico

United States vs Argentina

Group C

Brazil vs Guatemala

Peru vs Guatemala

Brazil vs Peru

7th to 9th

El Salvador vs Peru

Argentina vs Peru

El Salvador vs Argentina

Knockout stage

Quarter-finals

Mexico vs Ecuador

Guatemala vs Brazil

Semi-finals

Brazil vs USA

Canada vs Mexico

Play-off 5/6

Ecuador vs Guatemala

Play-off 3/4

Mexico vs Brazil

Final

Canada vs United States

Final ranking

References

External links
Official website
TournamentSoftware.com: Team Results
TournamentSoftware.com: Individual Results

Pan Am Badminton Championships
Pan Am Badminton Championships
Badminton tournaments in Mexico
International sports competitions hosted by Mexico
Pan Am Badminton Championships
Badminton tournaments in Jamaica
International sports competitions hosted by Jamaica
Pan Am Badminton Championships
Pan Am Badminton Championships
Pan Am Badminton Championships